The prevention paradox describes the seemingly contradictory situation where the majority of cases of a disease come from a population at low or moderate risk of that disease, and only a minority of cases come from the high risk population (of the same disease). This is because the number of people at high risk is small. The prevention paradox was first formally described in 1981 by the epidemiologist Geoffrey Rose. 

Especially during the COVID-19 pandemic of 2020, the term "prevention paradox" was also used to describe the apparent paradox of people questioning steps to prevent the spread of the pandemic because the prophesied spread did not occur. This however is instead an example of a self-defeating prophecy or a preparedness paradox.

Hypothetical case study 

For example, Rose describes the case of Down syndrome where maternal age is a risk factor. Yet, most cases of Down syndrome will be born to younger, low risk mothers (this is true at least in populations where most women have children at a younger age). This situation is paradoxical because it is common and logical to equate high-risk populations with making up the majority of the burden of disease.

Another example could be seen in terms of reducing overall alcohol problems in a population. Although less serious, most alcohol problems are not found among dependent drinkers. Greater societal gain will be obtained by achieving a small reduction in alcohol misuse within a far larger group of "risky" drinkers with less serious problems than by trying to reduce problems among a smaller number of dependent drinkers.

See also 
 False positive paradox
 Preparedness paradox

Notes and references

External links
 "Sick individuals and sick populations", G. Rose, Int J Epidem 1985; vol. 14, no. 1: pp. 32-38.
 "Commentary: The prevention paradox in lay epidemiology—Rose revisited", Kate Hunt and Carol Emslie, Int J Epidem 2001; vol. 30, no. 3: pp. 442-446.
 The Prevention Paradox Applies to Alcohol Use and Problems among Adolescents 

Medical terminology
Decision-making paradoxes